Lewisville School District was a school district headquartered in Lewisville, Arkansas. It operated Lewisville Elementary School and Lewisville High School. The mascot was the Red Devil. It served sections of Lafayette and Miller counties, including Lewisville and Garland.

On July 1, 1990, the Garland School District consolidated into the Lewisville School District. On July 1, 2003, the Lewisville district consolidated with the Stamps School District to form the Lafayette County School District.

References

Further reading
Maps of the predecessor districts
  (Download)
  (Download)

External links
 

Education in Lafayette County, Arkansas
Education in Miller County, Arkansas
2003 disestablishments in Arkansas
School districts disestablished in 2003
Defunct school districts in Arkansas